RDB may refer to:

In music:
 RDB (band) (RDB Rhythm Dhol Bass), a UK music production group

In technology:
 Oracle Rdb, a relational database 
 Amiga rigid disk block, describing partition information

Places:
 Richard Doll Building, Oxford, England

Other
 Kel-Tec RDB
 State Security Service (RDB), Serbian secret police